The 1983 Dutch TT was the eighth round of the 1983 Grand Prix motorcycle racing season. It took place on the weekend of 24–25 June 1983 at the TT Circuit Assen located in Assen, Netherlands.

Classification

500 cc

References

Dutch TT
Dutch
Tourist Trophy